Arnensee (French: Lac d'Arnon) is a lake in Canton of Berne, Switzerland. The lake in the municipality of Gsteig is used as a reservoir by Romande Energie. The dam was built in 1942. Its volume is 10.5 mio m³ and surface area 0.456 km².

See also
List of lakes of Switzerland
List of mountain lakes of Switzerland

External links
Arnensee 
Le Scaph: Site de plongée du Lac d'Arnon 
www.arnensee.ch

Lakes of Switzerland
Lakes of the canton of Bern
LArnensee